Ivory Coast competed at the 2019 African Games held from 19 to 31 August 2019 in Rabat, Morocco. In total, athletes representing Ivory Coast won five gold medals, five silver medals and eight bronze medals and the country finished in 12th place in the medal table.

Medal summary

Medal table 

|  style="text-align:left; width:78%; vertical-align:top;"|

|  style="text-align:left; width:22%; vertical-align:top;"|

Archery 

Six athletes represented Ivory Coast in archery. In total, two medals were won.

Esmei Anne Marcelle Diombo won the gold medal in the women's individual recurve event.

Diombo, Fatou Gbane and Ekpobi Anne-marie Eleonord Yedagne also won the silver medal in the women's team event.

Athletics 

Ivory Coast competed in several events in athletics.

Marie-Josée Ta Lou won the gold medal in the women's 100 metres event and Arthur Cissé won the silver medal in the men's 100 metres event.

Marie-Josée Ta Lou also won the bronze medal in the women's 200 metres event.

Canoeing 

Amian Valentin Amian and Noutai Jean Vignon competed in canoeing. Amian competed in the men's K-1 200 metres and men's K-1 1000 metres events and Vignon competed in the men's C-1 200 metres and men's C-1 1000 metres events.

Chess 

Foua Aroll Junior, Franklin Kouya Tyeoulou Bernadin, Madeleine Lorng Yowel and Marie Yavo Tchetche represented Ivory Coast in chess.

Fencing 

Ivory Coast competed in fencing.

Fencers representing Ivory Coast won a bronze medal in the men's team foil event.

Judo 

Seven athletes represented Ivory Coast in judo: Daouda Junior Dabone, Maïmouna Kenza Diarrassouba, Salimata Fofana, Bamadou Ouattara, Abdalah Sorogo and Nandjo Yoann Wilfried Yapi.

Rowing 

Enrico Semon Bouehi, Riccardo Monti Bouehi and Kouadio Franck N'Dri were scheduled to compete; only Riccardo Monti Bouehi and Kouadio Franck N'Dri competed in their events.

Taekwondo 

Cheick Sallah Cissé and Ruth Gbagbi were scheduled to compete in taekwondo at the 2019 African Games. Cheick Sallah Cissé previously won gold at the 2015 African Games.

In total athletes representing Ivory Coast in Taekwondo won three gold medals, two silver medals and five bronze medals.

Tennis 

Abdoulaziz Bationo, Eliakim Coulibaly, Kouadio Guillaume Koffi, Gueninle Abdoul Karim Ouattara and Marie Perla Biansumbra competed in tennis.

Bationo, Coulibaly, Koffi and Ouattara competed in the men's singles event.

Bationo and Koffi also competed in the men's doubles event.

Perla Biansumbra competed in the women's singles event.

Wrestling 

Ivory Coast competed in wrestling.

Eight athletes competed in wrestling: Abasse Abdoulaye Aladji, Nagoma Celine Bakayoko, Guy Alain Lago, Ulrich Elyse Manouan, Christ Emmanuel N'dri, Adama Tangara, N'de Caroline Yapi and Amy Youin.

References 

Nations at the 2019 African Games
2019
African Games